Bradley Anholt is a Canadian ecologist, currently a Canada Research Chair in experimental ecology at University of Victoria.

References

Year of birth missing (living people)
Living people
Academic staff of the University of Victoria
Canadian ecologists